The Latin or Roman Catholic Archbishopric of Neopatras is a titular see of the Catholic Church. It was established briefly as a residential episcopal see at Neopatras ("New Patras", modern Ypati) in Central Greece, after the Fourth Crusade, in place of the Greek Orthodox Metropolis of Neopatras. The archbishopric was restored as a titular see in 1933. Its last incumbent died in 1967.

Residential archbishops

Titular holders
The Latin archdiocese was nominally restored in 1933 as Catholic Metropolitan titular archbishopric (adj. Neopatrensis; Curiate Italian: Neopatrasso).

See also
 List of Catholic titular sees

References

Sources 
Novae Patrae at www.catholic-hierarchy.org
Titular Metropolitan See of Novæ Patræ at  www.gcatholic.org
Pius Bonifacius Gams, Series episcoporum Ecclesiae Catholicae, Leipzig 1931, p. 429

Gaetano Moroni, Patrasso o Neopatra o Nova Patrasso, in Dizionario di erudizione storico-ecclesiastica, Vol. LI, Venice 1851, p. 291
Konrad Eubel, Hierarchia Catholica Medii Aevi, Vol. 1 , p. 362; Vol. 2, p. XXXII

Catholic titular sees in Europe
Roman Catholic dioceses in the Crusader states
Medieval Central Greece
Former Roman Catholic dioceses in Greece
Ypati
Archbishopric
Lists of Roman Catholic bishops and archbishops